Vidmantas Povilionis (born 29 May 1948) is a Lithuanian politician.  In 1990 he was among those who signed the Act of the Re-Establishment of the State of Lithuania.

References
 Biography

1948 births
Living people
Lithuanian politicians